Carl Lüthje (22 January 1883 – 11 January 1969) was a German cyclist. He competed in two events at the 1912 Summer Olympics.

References

External links
 

1883 births
1969 deaths
People from Stormarn (district)
People from the Province of Schleswig-Holstein
German male cyclists
Olympic cyclists of Germany
Cyclists at the 1912 Summer Olympics
Cyclists from Schleswig-Holstein
19th-century German people
20th-century German people